Yuri Jonathan Vitor Coelho (born 12 June 1998), commonly known as Yuri, is a Brazilian footballer who plays as a forward for South Korean club Jeju United.

Career statistics

Club

Notes

References

External links

1998 births
Sportspeople from Minas Gerais
Living people
Brazilian footballers
Association football forwards
Associação Atlética Ponte Preta players
Coimbra Esporte Clube players
Gainare Tottori players
Associação Ferroviária de Esportes players
Leixões S.C. players
Capivariano Futebol Clube players
C.F. Estrela da Amadora players
Guarani FC players
Jeju United FC players
Campeonato Brasileiro Série A players
J3 League players
Campeonato Brasileiro Série D players
Liga Portugal 2 players
Campeonato Brasileiro Série B players
Brazilian expatriate footballers
Brazilian expatriate sportspeople in Japan
Expatriate footballers in Japan
Brazilian expatriate sportspeople in Portugal
Expatriate footballers in Portugal
Brazilian expatriate sportspeople in South Korea
Expatriate footballers in South Korea